Megan Hannah Lyman, (born April 15, 1991) is an American beauty pageant titleholder from Gilford, New Hampshire who was named Miss New Hampshire 2012. Megan currently works as a CBD advocate promoting natural health and healing with her company in Long Beach, California, Cannibabe.
url=http://www.cannibabe.com

Biography
She won the title of Miss New Hampshire on April 28, 2012, when she received her crown from outgoing titleholder Regan Hartley. Lyman's platform is the Make-A-Wish Foundation. At age 12, Lyman was diagnosed with soft-tissue sarcoma and underwent seven surgeries to remove cancerous tissue from her right arm. Her competition talent was a tap dance to Lady Gaga's Edge of Glory. Lyman is a junior at New England College, majoring in elementary and special education. In 2008, Lyman won the title of Miss New Hampshire's Outstanding Teen, and went on to compete in the Miss America's Outstanding Teen pageant in 2009.

References

External links

 

Miss America 2013 delegates
1991 births
Living people
People from Gilford, New Hampshire
American beauty pageant winners
New England College alumni